Private: #1 Suspect is the second book of the Jack Morgan series.  This novel was written by James Patterson and Maxine Paetro. More books in this series are to follow.

Plot
This book has several plots. The most important one involves Jack Morgan, the owner of Private, a private investigation company started by his father. Morgan comes back from a trip to find a former girlfriend murdered in his bed. Morgan is the number one suspect of this murder and has to clear himself of it or go to a lengthy trial. Morgan also owes a favor to a mobster, a favor he does not want to honor but is in no position to refuse. A third plot is the disappearance of a film star who is already in much legal trouble. Finally, Private seeks to solve a series of hotel murders that are the work of a serial killer.

Reviews
This book received at least three professional reviews, one of them favorable and two of them unfavorable. Joe Hartlaub of Bookreporter said in a very positive review, "Patterson and Paetro’s concept and execution for PRIVATE: #1 SUSPECT is flawless."

A very negative review appeared in University of California Highlander, a college newspaper. The reviewer said, "If you’re really interested in the frustrating adventures of Jack Morgan and company, look for “#1 Suspect” in its future destination: at the bottom of a dollar store bookshelf, next to the book lights." The Publishers Weekly website, in another negative review, said, "Unrelated subplots, including a serial killer who leaves his victims in different locations of a hotel chain, serve only to add to the book’s length. An evil identical twin doesn’t help with plausibility."

References

2012 American novels
Little, Brown and Company books
Novels by James Patterson
Collaborative novels